Marcin Piotr Niewiara (born April 2, 1981 in Wrocław) is a Polish bobsledder who has competed since 2006. At the 2010 Winter Olympics in Vancouver, he finished 14th in the four-man event and 16th in the two-man event.

Niewiara's best World Cup finish was also 14th in a four-man event in Park City, Utah in February 2009.

External links
 
 

1981 births
Bobsledders at the 2010 Winter Olympics
Living people
Polish male bobsledders
Olympic bobsledders of Poland
Sportspeople from Wrocław